Harma Anna Cornelia van Kreij (born 11 November 1993) is a Dutch female handballer for RK Krim and the Dutch national team.

She represented the Netherlands at the 2020 European Women's Handball Championship.

References

External links

Dutch female handball players
1993 births
Living people
People from Venray
Expatriate handball players
Dutch expatriate sportspeople in Germany
Dutch expatriate sportspeople in Slovenia
Sportspeople from Limburg (Netherlands)
21st-century Dutch women